The Karate Kid is a 2010 martial arts drama film directed by Harald Zwart, and part of The Karate Kid series. It stars Jaden Smith and Jackie Chan in lead roles, and it was produced by Jerry Weintraub, James Lassiter, Ken Stovitz, Will Smith and Jada Pinkett Smith. This film does not take place in the same fictional universe as the four previous Karate Kid films, but is instead a remake of the original 1984 film with the setting moved to China, and the martial art changed (despite the film's title) from karate to kung fu.

The plot concerns 12-year-old Dre Parker (Jaden Smith), from Detroit, Michigan, who moves to Beijing, China with his mother (Taraji P. Henson) and runs afoul of the neighborhood bully Cheng (Zhenwei Wang). He makes an unlikely ally in the form of an aging maintenance man, Mr. Han (Jackie Chan), a kung fu master who teaches him the secrets of self-defense. The screenplay was written by Christopher Murphey. The film's music was composed by James Horner. It is an international co-production between China, Hong Kong, and the United States.

Principal photography took place in Beijing, China, and filming began in July 2009 and ended on October 16. The Karate Kid was released theatrically worldwide on June 11, 2010, by Sony Pictures. The film earned $359 million on a $40 million budget.

Plot

12 year old Dre Parker leaves Detroit for Beijing after his widowed mother Sherry gets a job transfer at a car factory. There, Dre meets Meiying, a young violinist that reciprocates his attention. However, 15 year old Cheng, a rebellious Kung Fu prodigy whose family is close to Meiying's, keeps them apart by constantly attacking, teasing and bullying Dre. As revenge, Dre throws a bucket of dirty water over Cheng and his gang after a school field trip to the Forbidden City. Enraged, they chase, corner and brutally beat Dre at an alley. Mr. Han, a maintenance man who repaired for Sherry, intervenes and fends off the boys, revealing himself to be a Kung Fu master.

Mr. Han heals Dre's injuries using the ancient Chinese medicine methods of fire cupping. He explains that Cheng and his friends are not inherently bad, but made so by Master Li, who teaches his students to be merciless towards their enemies. Intrigued, Dre asks if Han could teach him Kung Fu. Mr. Han refuses and instead brings him to Li's Fighting Dragon studio to make peace. Li harshly rebuffs the peace offer and challenges Dre to a fight with Cheng. Mr. Han instead counters that Dre compete against Li's students at an upcoming Kung Fu tournament. He requests that his students leave Dre alone to train until then. Li begrudgingly accepts as long as Dre shows up at the tournament.

Mr. Han begins to teach Dre Kung Fu by emphasizing movements that apply to life in general. He conveys that serenity and maturity, not punches and power, are the true keys to mastering Kung fu. Han makes Dre perform repetitive motions using his jacket. Through this, Dre develops muscle memory. Han takes him to a Taoist temple in the Wudang Mountains. There, Dre witnesses a woman making a cobra reflect her movements and later drinks the water from a Taoist well. After many weeks of laborious training, Mr. Han gives Dre a day off. Dre goes to see Meiying, persuading her to cut school for a day of fun. This makes her nearly late for a violin audition, and her parents thus deem Dre a bad influence, forbidding her from ever seeing him again.

Dre heads to see Mr. Han, but finds him drunk and depressed, smashing a car he was working on. Mr. Han tearfully explains that he crashed the same car years ago, which killed his wife Zhang and 10-year-old son Gong Gong. He fixes the car every year but smashes it to remind himself of what happened. Dre decides to train harder and help his teacher overcome his trauma. Mr. Han assists Dre in writing and reciting a note of apology in Mandarin to Meiying's father. He accepts the apology, promising that Meiying will attend the tournament to support Dre.

At the tournament, the under-confident Dre starts defeating all of his opponents. Enraged, Li orders Liang, one of his students, to injure Dre in the semi-finals. Liang reluctantly does so by delivering a series of crippling blows to Dre's leg. He gets disqualified as a result, and Dre advances to the final against Cheng. Dre pleads with Mr. Han to heal his leg via the fire cupping method. Realizing this is more about overcoming Dre's fear than anything else, Mr. Han complies.

The final match starts. On Li's orders, Cheng attacks Dre's injured leg. This causes Dre to lose balance. Dre struggles but manages to get up and uses the snake stance he saw at the temple. The move is successful, and Dre catches Cheng with a kick to the head, defeating him. Dre wins the tournament, earning the respect of Cheng and his classmates. Cheng presents Dre with the trophy and all of the Fighting Dragon students bow down to Mr. Han, accepting him as their new master, leaving Li defeated.

Alternate ending 
In a sequence that was shot but cut from the final product, Master Li raises his hand to slap Cheng and his friends for not beating Dre in the tournament (he uses this method to punish his disciples), but he is stopped and reprimanded by Mr. Han, who thought that Master Li's students had already suffered too much at his hands. This eventually leads to a Kung Fu battle between Mr. Han and Master Li, who end up facing off in front of a surprised audience, the frightened Fighting Dragons and a shocked, confused, and injured Dre, who even with a limp, tries to go where Mr. Han is fighting, without understanding what happened.

The fight ends as Mr. Han kicks Master Li off the stage where the old master was sitting and furious, leaps from the stage towards Master Li, pinning him down and with his fist raised says against Master Li in Mandarin with a menacing tone: "Do not stop when our enemy is down. No mercy. No mercy in studio. No mercy in competition. No mercy in life. Our enemy deserves pain".

Dre and the Fighting Dragons watch from afar. One of the members of the Fighting Dragons tells Mr. Han to knock out Master Li. However, he is stopped by Dre, who says that Master Li has had enough of a beating. Dre and Mr. Han are congratulated by Cheng and the Fighting Dragons as they leave. In the end, Sherry (Dre's mom), along with Meiying, leave with the tournament trophy won by Dre, but not before punching Master Li for his students’ actions against Dre.

Cast

 Jaden Smith as Dre Parker. Based on Daniel LaRusso.
 Jackie Chan as Mr. Han, a Chinese maintenance man who becomes Dre's instructor and mentor. Based on Mr. Miyagi.
 Taraji P. Henson as Sherry Parker, Dre's mother. Based on Lucille LaRusso.
 Wenwen Han as Meiying, a violinist and Dre Parker's love interest. Based on Ali Mills.
 Zhenwei Wang as Cheng Based on Johnny Lawrence.
 Yu Rongguang as Master Li (李师傅 Lǐ-shīfu). Based on John Kreese.
 Luke Carberry as Harry, a boy who befriends Dre. Based on Freddy Fernandez.
 Shijia Lü as Liang, a friend and classmate of Cheng's. Based on Bobby Brown.
 Ji Wang as Mrs. Po, the principal of Dre's new school.
 Zhensu Wu as Meiying's father. Based on Mr. Mills.
 Zhiheng Wang as Meiying's mother. Based on Mrs. Mills.
 Yi Zhao as Zhuang, a friend and classmate of Cheng's. Based on Jimmy.
 Zhang Bo as Song, a friend and classmate of Cheng's. Based on Tommy.
 Cameron Hillman as Mark
 Ghye Samuel Brown as Oz

Production

Development
A remake of the original Karate Kid entered the development in the late 2008. Variety reported at the time that the new film, to be produced by Will Smith, "has been refashioned as a star vehicle for Jaden Smith" and that it would "borrow elements from the original plot, wherein a bullied youth learns to stand up for himself with the help of an eccentric mentor". Jackie Chan told a Los Angeles Chinatown concert crowd in 2009 that he was leaving for 
Beijing to film the remake as Jaden Smith's teacher.

Despite maintaining the original title, the 2010 remake does not feature karate, which is from Okinawa (Japan), but focuses on the main character learning kung fu in China. Chan told interviewers that film cast members generally referred to the film as The Kung Fu Kid, and he believed the film would only be called The Karate Kid in America, and The Kung Fu Kid in China. This theory held true in the People's Republic of China, where the film is titled The Kung Fu Dream. In Japan and South Korea, the film is titled Best Kid after the local title of the 1984 film in both countries.

Sony had considered changing the title of the film, but Jerry Weintraub, one of the producers, rejected the idea. Weintraub was also the producer of the original Karate Kid.

Filming
The Chinese government granted the filmmakers access to the Forbidden City, the Great Wall of China, and the Wudang Mountains. On some occasions, the filmmakers had to negotiate with residents who were not accustomed to filming activity. The feature started being filmed in July 2009.

Music

Icelandic composer Atli Örvarsson was originally hired to score the film, but he was replaced by American composer James Horner. The Karate Kid marked Horner's return to scoring after his work on the 2009 film Avatar. The score was released on June 15, 2010.

Justin Bieber and Jaden Smith recorded the official theme song to the film "Never Say Never", written by Adam Messinger, Bieber, Travis Garland, Omarr Rambert, and others, and produced by The Messengers (Adam Messinger and Nasri Atweh). The music video was released on May 31, 2010.

The film started with "Do You Remember" by Jay Sean featuring Sean Paul and Lil Jon. "Remember the Name" by Fort Minor was used in the trailer to promote the movie. Parts of the song, "Back in Black" by AC/DC and "Higher Ground" by the Red Hot Chili Peppers, were also used in the film. The song "Hip Song" by Rain is used for promotion in the Asian countries and it appeared in the trailer. The music video was released on May 22, 2010. "Bang Bang" by K'naan featuring Adam Levine and "Say" by John Mayer are also featured in the movie. It also features Lady Gaga's "Poker Face", Flo Rida's "Low" and Gorillaz' "Dirty Harry" (being performed in Chinese). An abbreviated form of Frédéric Chopin's Nocturne No. 20 is featured, arranged for strings, in Meiying's violin audition scene, along with Sergei Rachmaninoff's piano transcription of "Flight of the Bumblebee" by Rimsky-Korsakov.

Release

The film premiered May 26, 2010, in Chicago, with appearances by Jackie Chan and Jaden Smith, and a brief surprise appearance from Will Smith.

In the Mainland China version of the film, scenes of bullying were shortened by the censors, and a kissing scene is removed. John Horn of the Los Angeles Times said that the editing ultimately resulted in "two slightly different movies".

Home media
The Karate Kid was released on DVD and Blu-ray on October 5, 2010, by Sony Pictures Home Entertainment, and it was released on Mastered in 4K Blu-ray on May 14, 2013.

Reception

Critical response

Review aggregation website Rotten Tomatoes gives the film an approval rating of 66% based on 211 reviews, and an average rating of 6.17/10. The site's critics consensus reads: "It may not be as powerful as the 1984 edition, but the 2010 Karate Kid delivers a surprisingly satisfying update on the original". Metacritic, another review aggregator, assigned the film a weighted average score of 61 out of 100 based on 37 critics, indicating "generally favorable reviews". Audiences polled by CinemaScore gave the film an average grade of "A" on an A+ to F scale, the highest of the franchise.

Ann Hornaday described Jaden Smith as a "revelation", who "proves that he's no mere beneficiary of dynastic largesse. Somber, self-contained and somehow believable as a kid for whom things don't come easily, he never conveys the sense that he's desperate to be liked. Which is precisely why The Karate Kid winds up being so likable itself". Roger Ebert of the Chicago Sun-Times gave it a positive review, rating the film three and a half out of four stars, and calling it "a lovely and well-made film that stands on its own feet". Claudia Puig of USA Today and Owen Gleiberman of Entertainment Weekly each rated the film a 'B', stating "the chemistry between Jaden Smith and Jackie Chan grounds the movie, imbuing it with sincerity and poignance" and that the film is "fun and believable".

Simon Abrams of Slant Magazine gave the film one and a half stars and noted that "the characters just aren't old enough to be convincing in their hormone-driven need to prove themselves" and "this age gap is also a huge problem when it comes to the range that these kids bring to the project" and noted the portrayal of the child antagonist Cheng includes an "overblown and overused grimace, which looks like it might have originally belonged to Dolph Lundgren, looks especially silly on a kid that hasn't learned how to shave yet". Finally, Abrams noted: "What's most upsetting is Dre's budding romance with Meiying. These kids have yet to hit puberty and already they're swooning for each other".

Box office
The film was released on June 11, 2010, by Columbia Pictures to 3,663 theaters across the United States. The Karate Kid topped the box office on its opening day, grossing $18.8 million, and in its opening weekend, grossing $56 million in North America, beating The A-Team, which grossed an estimated $9.6 million on the same opening day, and $26 million in its opening weekend. It closed on September 18, after 101 days of release, grossing $176 million in the US and Canada along with an additional $182 million overseas for a worldwide total of $359 million, on a moderate budget of $40 million.

Awards and nominations
People's Choice Awards 2011
 Favorite Family Movie (Nominated)
 Favorite On-Screen Team – Jaden Smith & Jackie Chan (Nominated)
 Favorite Action Star – Jackie Chan (Won)
2011 Kids' Choice Awards
 Favorite Movie (Won)
 Favorite Buttkicker (Jackie Chan) (Won)
 Favorite Movie Actor (Jaden Smith) (Nominated)
2011 MTV Video Music Aid Japan
 Best Song from a Movie ("Never Say Never" by Justin Bieber featuring Jaden Smith) (Nominated)
2011 MTV Movie Awards
 Biggest Badass Star (Jaden Smith) (Nominated)
32nd Young Artist Awards
 Best Leading Young Actor in a Feature Film (Jaden Smith) (Won)
2010 Teen Choice Awards
 Choice Summer: Movie (Nominated)

Future
Shortly after the film's release, a sequel was announced to be in development, with Jaden Smith, Jackie Chan and Taraji P. Henson all reprising their roles. Breck Eisner was initially set to direct, but by June 2014 the film had gained new writers and lost Eisner as the director. In April 2017, Eisner returned as director, but in October, Chan stated that the initial script for the film did not work well, and that they would work on new drafts. As of now, the film's status remains unknown.

In a 2021 interview with Slashfilm, the writers of Cobra Kai, which is a sequel to the original film series, revealed that characters from the 2010 remake are not making appearances in the series, as they are not a part of the "Miyagi-verse": "We've ruled that out completely. Jackie Chan is mentioned in season 1 of the show as a human, so I think in our world, Jackie Chan is an actor and a performer. If the characters on our show have seen a movie called The Karate Kid, they've seen that one".

In September 2022, a new Karate Kid film was confirmed to be in development, with a release date of June 7, 2024.

See also
List of black films of the 2010s

References

External links
 
 
 
 
 

2010 films
2010s coming-of-age films
African-American drama films
American martial arts films
American coming-of-age films
Remakes of American films
Chinese martial arts films
Chinese coming-of-age films
Columbia Pictures films
2010s English-language films
Films about bullying
Films about child abuse
Films directed by Harald Zwart
Films produced by Jada Pinkett Smith
Films produced by Will Smith
Films scored by James Horner
Films set in Beijing
Films set in China
Films set in Detroit
Films shot in Beijing
Films shot in China
Films shot in Michigan
Hong Kong martial arts films
The Karate Kid (franchise) films
Kung fu films
2010s Mandarin-language films
Martial arts films
Martial arts tournament films
Overbrook Entertainment films
2010 martial arts films
Films shot in Detroit
2010 drama films
2010s American films
2010s Hong Kong films
English-language Chinese films
Chinese remakes of foreign films